Kågeröds BoIF is a Swedish football club located in Kågeröd.

Background
Kågeröds BoIF currently plays in Division 3 Sydvästra Götaland which is the fifth tier of Swedish football. They play their home matches at the Brahevallen in Kågeröd.

The club is affiliated to Skånes Fotbollförbund.

Season to season

Footnotes

External links
 Kågeröds BoIF – Official website
 Kågeröds BoIF on Facebook

Sport in Skåne County
Football clubs in Skåne County
1934 establishments in Sweden